The 2022–23 South Dakota State Jackrabbits men's basketball team represents South Dakota State University in the 2022–23 NCAA Division I men's basketball season. The Jackrabbits, led by fourth-year head coach Eric Henderson, play their home games at Frost Arena in Brookings, South Dakota, as members of the Summit League.

Previous season
The Jackrabbits finished the 2021–22 season with a 30–5 record and went 18–0 in Summit League play. South Dakota State won the Summit League regular season and the Summit League tournament. The Jackrabbits received an automatic bid to the NCAA Tournament with a 13 seed in the Midwest region. The Jackrabbits would lose to the Providence in the first round 57–66.

Offseason

Departures

Incoming transfers

2022 recruiting class

Roster

Schedule and results

|-
!colspan=12 style=| Exhibition

|-
!colspan=12 style=| Non-conference regular season

|-
!colspan=12 style=| Summit League regular season

|-
!colspan=12 style=|Summit League tournament

Source

References

South Dakota State Jackrabbits men's basketball seasons
South Dakota State Jackrabbits
South Dakota State Jackrabbits men's basketball
South Dakota State Jackrabbits men's basketball